Plant defense may refer to:
 Plant defense against herbivory
 Inducible plant defenses against herbivory
 Plant tolerance to herbivory
 Plant use of endophytic fungi in defense
 Plant disease resistance
 Disease resistance in fruit and vegetables
 Secondary metabolite
 Hypersensitive response

See also
 Protocarnivorous plant